Prince of Bel Air is a 1986 American made-for-television romantic comedy film starring Mark Harmon, Kirstie Alley, and Robert Vaughn. It first aired on ABC on January 20, 1986.

Premise
A Los Angeles pool cleaner accustomed to living a womanizing lifestyle runs into a challenge when he meets a wealthy, attractive new love interest.

Cast
 Mark Harmon - Robin Prince
 Kirstie Alley - Jamie Harrison
 Robert Vaughn - Stanley Auerbach
 Patrick Labyorteaux - Justin
 Bartley Braverman -  Larry Kampion
 Deborah Harmon - Carol Kampion
 Katherine Moffat - Kelli
 Scott Getlin - Steve Cooper
 Michael Horton - Michael Jacobs
 Jonathan Stark - Brad Griffin
 Sherry Hursey - Sandi
 Lisanne Falk - Stacy
 Dean Cameron - Willard
 Don Swayze - Darryl
 Barbara Crampton - Anne White

European version
The version for European theatrical exhibition includes one brief scene with two actresses, Barbara Crampton and Katherine Moffat, appearing topless. None of the nudity involves any of the leads of the show.

Reception

The film received a mostly negative critical response.

References

External links
 

1986 television films
1986 films
1986 romantic comedy films
ABC network original films
American television films
American romantic comedy films
Films directed by Charles Braverman
Films scored by Robert Folk
1980s English-language films
1980s American films